The 1989 Cork Intermediate Football Championship was the 54th staging of the Cork Intermediate Football Championship since its establishment by the Cork County Board in 1909. The draw for the opening round fixtures took place on 18 December 1988. The championship ran from 7 May to 8 October 1989.

The final replay was played on 8 October 1989 at Páirc Mhic Ghiobúin in Milford, between Rockchapel and Mallow, in what was their first ever final meeting. Rockchapel won the match by 0-09 to 0-04 to claim their first ever championship title.

Rockchapel's Jerry Casey was the championship's top scorer with 1-19.

Results

First round

Second round

Quarter-finals

Semi-finals

Final

Championship statistics

Top scorers

Overall

In a single game

References

Cork Intermediate Football Championship